Shuck Island is a small island in the Mississippi River, located in Pike County, Illinois, opposite Hannibal, Missouri.

References

Mississippi River
River islands of Illinois